Sotheby is a surname, and may refer to:

 Admiral Sir Edward Southwell Sotheby (1813–1902), Royal Navy officer
 John Sotheby (1740–1807), English auctioneer and founder of Sotheby's
 Samuel Sotheby (1771–1842), English auctioneer and antiquarian
 Samuel Leigh Sotheby (1805–1861), English auctioneer and antiquarian, son of Samuel Sotheby (1771–1842)
 William Sotheby (1757–1833), English poet and translator

See also
 Sotheby's, art and auction corporation named for John Sotheby